Christina Georgina Rossetti (5 December 1830 – 29 December 1894) was an English writer of romantic, devotional and children's poems, including "Goblin Market" and "Remember". She also wrote the words of two Christmas carols well known in Britain: "In the Bleak Midwinter", later set by Gustav Holst, Katherine Kennicott Davis, and Harold Darke, and "Love Came Down at Christmas", also set by Darke and other composers. She was a sister of the artist and poet Dante Gabriel Rossetti and features in several of his paintings.

Early life and education
Christina Rossetti was born in 38 Charlotte Street (now 110 Hallam Street), London, to Gabriele Rossetti, a poet and a political exile from Vasto, Abruzzo, Italy, since 1824 and Frances Polidori, the sister of Lord Byron's friend and physician John William Polidori. She had two brothers and a sister: Dante Gabriel became an influential artist and poet, and William Michael and Maria both became writers. Christina, the youngest and a lively child, dictated her first story to her mother before she had learnt to write.

Rossetti was educated at home by her mother and father through religious works, classics, fairy tales and novels. Rossetti delighted in the works of Keats, Scott, Ann Radcliffe and Matthew Lewis. The influence of the work of Dante Alighieri, Petrarch and other Italian writers filled the home and influenced Rossetti's later writing. Their household was open to visiting Italian scholars, artists and revolutionaries. The family homes in Bloomsbury at no.38 and later no.50 Charlotte (Hallam) Street (now demolished) were within easy reach of Madame Tussauds, London Zoo and the newly opened Regent's Park, which she visited regularly. Unlike her parents, Rossetti felt at home in London and was seemingly happy.

In the 1840s, Rossetti's family faced financial troubles due to a deterioration in her father's physical and mental health. In 1843, he was diagnosed with persistent bronchitis, possibly tuberculosis, and faced losing his sight. He gave up his teaching post at King's College and though he lived another 11 years, suffered from depression and was never physically well again. Rossetti's mother began teaching to support the family, and Maria became a live-in governess, a prospect that Christina Rossetti dreaded. At the time her brother William was working for the Excise Office and Gabriel was at art school, leaving Christina increasingly isolated at home. When she was 14, she suffered a nervous breakdown and left school. Bouts of depression and related illness followed. During this period she, her mother and her sister became absorbed in the Anglo-Catholic movement that developed in the Church of England. Religious devotion came to play a major role in her life.

In her late teens, Rossetti became engaged to the painter James Collinson, the first of three suitors. He, like her brothers Dante and William, was a founding member of the avant-garde Pre-Raphaelite Brotherhood, established in 1848. The engagement ended in 1850 when he reverted to Catholicism. In 1853, when the family had financial difficulties, Christina helped her mother keep a school in Fromefield, Frome, but it did not succeed. A plaque marks the house. In 1854 the pair returned to London, where Christina's father died. She later became involved with the linguist Charles Cayley, but declined to marry him, also for religious reasons. A third offer came from the painter John Brett, whom she likewise refused.

Rossetti sat for several of Dante Gabriel Rossetti's paintings. In 1848, she sat for the Virgin Mary in his first completed oil painting, The Girlhood of Mary Virgin, and the first work he inscribed with the initials "PRB", later revealed as standing for the Pre-Raphaelite Brotherhood. The following year she modelled for his depiction of the Annunciation, Ecce Ancilla Domini. A line from her poem "Who shall deliver me?" inspired a painting by Fernand Khnopff called I lock my door upon myself. In 1849 she again became seriously ill with depression, and around 1857 had a major religious crisis.

Career

From 1842 onward Rossetti began writing down and dating her poems. Most of them imitated her favoured poets. In 1847 she began experimenting with verse forms such as sonnets, hymns and ballads, while drawing narratives from the Bible, folk tales and the lives of saints. Her early pieces often meditate on death and loss in the Romantic tradition. Her first two poems published were "Death's Chill Between" and "Heart's Chill Between", in the Athenaeum magazine in 1848. She used the pseudonym "Ellen Alleyne" in the literary periodical, The Germ, published by the Pre-Raphaelites from January to April 1850 and edited by her brother William. This marked the beginning of her public career.

Rossetti's more critical reflections on the artistic movement her brother had begun were expressed in an 1856 poem "In the Artist's Studio". Here she reflects on seeing multiple paintings of the same model. For Rossetti, the artist's idealised vision of the model's character begins to overwhelm his work, until "every canvas means/the one same meaning." Dinah Roe, in her introduction to the Penguin Classics collection of Pre-Raphaelite poetry, argues that this critique of her brother and similar male artists is less about "the objectification of women" than about "the male artist's self-worship".

Rossetti's first commercially printed collection, Goblin Market and Other Poems, appeared in 1862, when she was 31. It was widely praised by critics, who placed her as the foremost female poet of the day. She was lauded by Gerard Manley Hopkins, Algernon Swinburne and Tennyson. After its publication, she was named the natural successor to Elizabeth Barrett Browning, who had died the year before in 1861. The title poem, one of her best known, is ostensibly about two sisters' misadventures with goblins, but critics have seen it in various ways including an allegory of temptation and salvation, a comment on Victorian gender roles and female agency, and a work of erotic desire and social redemption.

Rossetti worked voluntarily in 1859–1870 at the St Mary Magdalene house of charity in Highgate, a refuge for ex-prostitutes. It is suggested that Goblin Market may have been inspired by "fallen women" she came to know. There are parallels with Samuel Taylor Coleridge's The Rime of the Ancient Mariner in religious themes of temptation, sin and redemption by vicarious suffering. Swinburne in 1883 dedicated A Century of Roundels to Rossetti, as she adopted his roundel form in a number of poems, for instance in Wife to Husband. She was ambivalent about women's suffrage, but many have found feminist themes in her work. She opposed slavery in the United States, cruelty to animals in prevalent vivisection, and exploitation of girls in under-age prostitution.

Rossetti kept a wide circle of friends and correspondents. She continued to write and publish for the rest of her life, mainly devotional work and children's poetry. In the years just before her death, she wrote The Face of the Deep, (1892) a book of devotional prose, and oversaw an enlarged edition of Sing-Song, originally published in 1872, in 1893. She died late the next year.

Later life

In her later decades, Rossetti suffered from a type of hyperthyroidism – Graves' disease – diagnosed in 1872, suffering a near-fatal attack in the early 1870s. In 1893, she developed breast cancer. The tumour was removed, but there was a recurrence in September 1894.

Christina Rossetti died on 29 December 1894 and was buried on New Year's Day 1895 in the family grave on the west side of Highgate Cemetery. There she joined her father, mother and Elizabeth Siddal, wife of her brother Dante Gabriel. Her brother William was also buried there in 1919, as were the ashes of four subsequent family members.

There is a stone tablet on the façade of 30 Torrington Square, Bloomsbury, marking her final home, where she died.

Recognition
Rossetti's popularity in her lifetime did not approach that of her contemporary Elizabeth Barrett Browning, but her standing remained strong after her death. Her popularity faded in the early 20th century in the wake of Modernism, but scholars began to explore Freudian themes in her work, such as religious and sexual repression, reaching for personal, biographical interpretations of her poetry. Academics studying her work in the 1970s saw beyond the lyrical sweetness to her mastery of prosody and versification. Feminists held her as symbol of constrained female genius and a leader among 19th-century poets. Her writings strongly influenced writers such as Ford Madox Ford, Virginia Woolf, Gerard Manley Hopkins, Elizabeth Jennings, and Philip Larkin. The critic Basil de Sélincourt called her "all but our greatest woman poet... incomparably our greatest craftswoman... probably in the first twelve of the masters of English verse."

Rossetti's Christmas poem "In the Bleak Midwinter" became widely known in the English-speaking world after her death, when set as a Christmas carol by Gustav Holst and later by Harold Darke. Her poem "Love Came Down at Christmas" (1885) has also been widely arranged as a carol.

British composers receptive to Rossetti's verse included Alexander Mackenzie (Three Songs, Op. 17, 1878), Frederick Cowen, Samuel Coleridge-Taylor (Six Sorrow Songs, Op. 57, 1904), Hubert Parry, Hope Squire, and Charles Villiers Stanford. In 1918, John Ireland set eight poems from her Sing-Song: A Nursery Rhyme Book to music in his song cycle Mother and Child. The poem "Song" was an inspiration for Bear McCreary's composition When I Am Dead, published in 2015. Two of Rossetti's poems, "Where Sunless Rivers Weep" and "Weeping Willow", were set to music by Barbara Arens in her All Beautiful & Splendid Things: 12 + 1 Piano Songs on Poems by Women (2017, Editions Musica Ferrum). Rossetti's "Love is Like a Rose" was set to music by Constance Cochnower Virtue; "Love Me, I Love You," was set to music by Hanna Vollenhoven; and "Song of the Dawn" was set to music by Elise Fellows White.

In 2000, one of many Millennium projects across the country was a poetry stone placed in what had been the grounds of North Hill House in Frome. On one side is an excerpt from her poem, "What Good Shall My Life Do Me": "Love lights the sun: love through the dark/Lights the moon's evanescent arc:/Same Love lights up the glow-worms spark." She wrote about her brief stay in Frome, which had "an abundance of green slopes and gentle declivities: no boldness or grandeur but plenty of peaceful beauty".

In 2011, Rossetti was a subject of a Radio 4 programme, In Our Time.

The title of J. K. Rowling's novel The Cuckoo's Calling (2013) follows a line in Rossetti's poem A Dirge.

Christina Rossetti is commemorated in the Church of England calendar on 27 April.

Ancestry

Publications

Poetry collections
Verses, London: privately printed, 1847
Goblin Market and Other Poems, London: Macmillan, 1862
1876, author's revised edition
The Prince's Progress and Other Poems, London: Macmillan, 1866
Goblin Market, The Prince's Progress, and Other Poems. London: Macmillan, 1879
Sing-Song: A Nursery Rhyme Book (1872, 1893)
A Pageant and Other Poems (1881)
Verses, London: Society for Promoting Christian Knowledge, 1893
New Poems, London: Macmillan, 1896
The Rossetti Birthday Book, London: privately printed, 1896
The Poetical Works of Christina Georgina Rossetti, ed. William Michael Rossetti, London: Macmillan, 1904
The Complete Poems of Christina Rossetti, ed. Rebecca W. Crump with publication notes, in three volumes, Baton Rouge: Louisiana State University Press, 1979–1985
When I am Dead my Dearest

Fiction
Commonplace and Other Stories, London: Ellis, 1870
Speaking Likenesses, London: Macmillan, 1874

Non-fiction
Called to Be Saints, London: Society for Promoting Christian Knowledge, 1881
"Dante, an English Classic", Churchman's Shilling Magazine and Family Treasury 2 (1867), pp. 200–205
"Dante: The Poet Illustrated out of the Poem". The Century (February 1884), pp. 566–573
The Face of the Deep, London: Society for Promoting Christian Knowledge, 1893
Seek and Find: A Double Series of Short Studies of the Benedicite, London: Society for Promoting Christian Knowledge, 1879
Time Flies: A Reading Diary, London: Society for Promoting Christian Knowledge, 1885

References

Sources

David Clifford and Laurence Roussillon, Outsiders Looking In: The Rossettis Then and Now. London: Anthem, 2004
 
Antony Harrison, Christina Rossetti in Context. Chapel Hill, N.C.: University of North Carolina Press, 1988
Maura Ives, Christina Rossetti: A Descriptive Bibliography. New Castle, D.E.: Oak Knoll, 2011
Kathleen Jones, Christina Rossetti: Learning Not To Be First
Kathleen Jones, Learning Not to be First: A Biography of Christina Rossetti. Oxford: Oxford University Press, 1991
Jan Marsh, Introduction, Christina Rossetti, Poems and Prose. London: Everyman, 1994. xvii–xxxiii
Jan Marsh, Christina Rossetti: A Writer's Life. New York: Viking, 1994

External links
Poems and poetry at the Poetry Foundation	
Profile at Poets.org 	
"Christina Rossetti", In our time, BBC Radio 4 (audio, 45 minutes)
Rossetti Family Correspondence at University of Kansas Libraries

Open Library

Christina Rossetti in Encyclopedia of Fantasy (1997)
Christina Rossetti Collection. General Collection, Beinecke Rare Book and Manuscript Library.

1830 births
1894 deaths
Anglo-Catholic poets
Anglican saints
Burials at Highgate Cemetery
Christian hymnwriters
English Anglo-Catholics
English hymnwriters
English people of Italian descent
English women poets
English fantasy writers
People from the London Borough of Camden
Polidori-Rossetti family
Sonneteers
Victorian poets
Victorian women writers
19th-century English women writers
19th-century British writers
19th-century British musicians
Anglo-Catholic writers
British women hymnwriters
British people of Italian descent
19th-century British women musicians
Rossetti family
Writers from London